The Afro-Asian U-23 Champions Cup was an international football competition endorsed by the Confederation of African Football (CAF) and the Asian Football Confederation (AFC), contested between representative nations from these confederations, usually the winners of the Africa U-23 Cup of Nations and the winners of the AFC U-23 Championship.

Qualified teams
 - Champions of 2019 Africa U-23 Cup of Nations
 - Champions of 2020 AFC U-23 Championship

Matches

See also
Afro-Asian Cup of Nations

External links
 Afro-Asian Cup of Nations - rsssf.com
 Coupe afro asiatique des nations - football-the-story.com

Asian Football Confederation competitions for national teams
Confederation of African Football competitions for national teams
2020 in Asian football
2020 in African football
2020 in youth association football